William Henry Hudson Southerland (July 10, 1852 – January 30, 1933) was a rear admiral in the United States Navy. He commanded several ships in Cuban waters during the Spanish–American War, and later served as Commander in Chief of the Pacific Fleet.

Biography
Born in New York City, Southerland first joined the Union Navy as a volunteer towards the end of the Civil War, despite being only twelve years old, serving for only a brief time. He re-enlisted in early 1867 as a naval apprentice, finally entered the United States Naval Academy in June 1868, shortly before his sixteenth birthday.

After graduating from the Academy in June 1872 he served aboard the sloop . After a year at sea, he was commissioned as an ensign.

Over the next 37 years, he served in varied positions at sea and ashore, including duty with the Hydrographic Office, the Bureau of Equipment, and the Board of Inspection and Survey. During the Spanish–American War, he commanded the gunboat  in the blockade of Cuban ports; and, in 1905, he returned to the Caribbean to command  and to act as Senior Officer, Naval Forces in Santo Domingo. Promoted to captain in 1906, he commanded the battleship  of the Great White Fleet in 1907–09.

Appointed rear admiral on May 4, 1910, he served as President of the Board of Inspection and Survey for Shore Stations until becoming Commander, 2d Division, Pacific Fleet in March 1911, and commanded naval forces in the Nicaragua Expedition. A year later, he became Commander in Chief, Pacific Fleet; and, in March 1913, he left the fleet to take up duties on the General Board.

On his retirement on July 10, 1914 Southerland was the last Civil War naval veteran still in active service, and one of very few to rise from enlisted man to admiral in the course of his career.

Rear Admiral Southerland died in Washington, D.C., on January 30, 1933.

Namesake
The destroyer  (1944–1981) was named in his honor.

References

 

1852 births
1933 deaths
Union Navy sailors
United States Navy admirals
United States Naval Academy alumni
American military personnel of the Spanish–American War
Military personnel from New York City
People of New York (state) in the American Civil War